4082 Swann, provisional designation , is a carbonaceous asteroid from the inner regions of the asteroid belt, approximately 10 kilometers in diameter.

The asteroid was discovered on 27 September 1984, by American astronomer Carolyn Shoemaker at Palomar Observatory in California, United States, and later named for American geologist Gordon Swann.

Orbit and classification 

Swann orbits the Sun in the inner main-belt at a distance of 1.8–3.0 AU once every 3 years and 8 months (1,349 days). Its orbit has an eccentricity of 0.26 and an inclination of 10° with respect to the ecliptic.

Physical characteristics 

The C-type asteroid is classified as a Ch-subtype in the SMASS taxonomy.

Diameter and albedo 

According to the surveys carried out by the Japanese Akari satellite and NASA's Wide-field Infrared Survey Explorer with its subsequent NEOWISE mission, Swann measures 9.5 and 11.1 kilometers in diameter and its surface has an albedo of 0.029 and 0.101, respectively. The Collaborative Asteroid Lightcurve Link, however, assumes a standard albedo for stony asteroids of 0.20 and derives a much smaller diameter of 5.85 kilometers, based on an absolute magnitude of 13.46.

Rotation period 

In July 2006, a rotational lightcurve of Swann was obtained from photometric observations by Petr Pravec at the Ondřejov Observatory in the Czech Republic. It gave a rotation period of  hours with a brightness variation of 0.67 magnitude. A second lightcurve obtained by Jean-Gabriel Bosch in September 2006, gave a period of  hours and an amplitude of 0.35 magnitude.

Naming 

This minor planet was named after American geologist Gordon A. Swann (born 1931). He served as the principal investigator of the "Apollo Lunar Geologic Experiment" conducted at the lunar landing sites of Apollo 14 and Apollo 15. The official naming citation was published by the Minor Planet Center on 12 December 1989.

Notes

References

External links 
 Gordon Swann, Astrogeology Science Center, USGS
 Asteroid Lightcurve Database (LCDB), query form (info )
 Dictionary of Minor Planet Names, Google books
 Asteroids and comets rotation curves, CdR – Observatoire de Genève, Raoul Behrend
 Discovery Circumstances: Numbered Minor Planets (1)-(5000) – Minor Planet Center
 
 

004082
Discoveries by Carolyn S. Shoemaker
Named minor planets
004082
19840927